Stanislaw Zalewski (16 December 1907 – 23 December 1992) was a Polish sailor. He competed in the mixed 6 metres in the 1936 Summer Olympics.

References

1907 births
1992 deaths
Polish male sailors (sport)
Olympic sailors of Poland
Sailors at the 1936 Summer Olympics – 6 Metre
People from Kutno
Sportspeople from Łódź Voivodeship